Alvord High School is a public high school located in the city of Alvord, Texas, USA and classified as a 2A school by the UIL.  It is a part of the Alvord Independent School District located in north central Wise County.   In 2015, the school was rated "Met Standard" by the Texas Education Agency.

Athletics
The Alvord Bulldogs compete in these sports - 

Volleyball, Cross Country, Football, Basketball, Powerlifting, Golf, Tennis, Track, Baseball & Softball

State Titles
Girls Cross Country - 
1998(1A), 1999(1A)

State Finalist
Girls Basketball - 
1995(1A)

References

External links
Alvord ISD website

Public high schools in Texas
Schools in Wise County, Texas